Nasser Ahmed Mohammedoh Al-Gahwashi (born on 24 May 1999), is a Yemeni professional football player who plays for the Iraqi Premier League club Al-Shorta and Yemeni national team.

On 19 November 2019, Al-Gahwashi scored his first goal for Yemen at the 2022 FIFA World Cup qualification in a 1–2 defeat to Singapore.

International goals
Scores and results list Yemen's goal tally first.

References

1999 births
Living people
Yemeni footballers
Yemen international footballers
People from Al Bayda Governorate
Association football defenders
Al-Mina'a SC players
Al-Shorta SC players
Yemeni expatriate footballers
Yemeni expatriate sportspeople in Iraq